The River Gannel (meaning lovage river) rises in the village of Indian Queens in mid Cornwall, England, United Kingdom. It flows north under Trevemper Bridge and becomes a tidal estuary, the Gannel (meaning the Channel), that divides the town of Newquay from the village of Crantock and joins the Celtic Sea.

The estuary contains a historic boatyard and is an important location for migratory birds.

The river is known for a legend called the Gannel Crake, an unusual noise which might be heard "crying out". During the 19th century it was described as being like "a thousand voices pent up in misery, with one long wail dying away in the distance". It is traditionally referred to by the superstitious natives as the cry of a troubled spirit that ever haunts the scene.

In 2014, storms damaged a wall that altered the course of the river, so that it now flows across Crantock beach.

Ferry

A seasonal ferry runs from the Fern Pit across to Crantock beach.

Ship Building
In the 1870s Thomas and John Clemens built 10 schooners.

References

External links

Gannel, River
Newquay
Marine reserves of the United Kingdom